The 2003 Kansas Jayhawks football team represented the University of Kansas in the 2003 NCAA Division I-A football season. They participated as members of the Big 12 Conference in the North Division. They were coached by head coach Mark Mangino and played their home games at Memorial Stadium in Lawrence, Kansas.

Schedule

Game summaries

Tangerine Bowl

References

Kansas
Kansas Jayhawks football seasons
Kansas Jayhawks football